Amor Aeternus – Hymns of Love is a music drama by Nicholas Lens. It is the third part of the operatic trilogy The Accacha Chronicles. The work follows on the parts Flamma Flamma and Terra Terra. In 19 sections, the score combines orchestra, chorus and six operatic voices that contrast with the eerie tonalities of two female nasal-natural singers .

Usage

Excerpts of the tracks Amor Amore, Amor Aeternus I, Utrum Vulva and Amor Mundum of Amor Aeternus were used as soundtrack of the symbolical film love is the only master I’ll serve, directed by Nicholas Lens and produced by Tabaran Company. The film premiered at the BIFF, New York City in June 2006.

Notes
Amor Aeternus was recorded mostly in Bulgaria and Belgium, but as well in Morocco and South Africa.
It was the fourth album on which Lens worked with the American soprano Claron McFadden.
According to the critics with this work Lens is slowly leaving the path of tonality of his earlier work. Some regret that he changed his style to a more severe and complex approach, others find this interesting and believe Lens' style is more evolving towards operatic, contemporary-theatrical creations.
The live-version, published by Schott Music (Mainz, New York) did not premiere yet.

Credits
Third part of the operatic trilogy by Nicholas Lens The Accacha Chronicles
Music & Libretto, Concept, Artistic Producer: Nicholas Lens
Published by Schott Music International Mainz/ New York City, (2005)
Released (2005) by Sony BMG International 74321 697182

Track listing

 Amor Amore
 Iuppiter Olympum
 Mors Neutra
 Amor Mundum
 Aliosne
 Utrum Vulva
 Nam Sum I
 Corpore Toto
 Nomen Meum
 Matutinum
 Amor Aeternus I
 Timore Amore
 O Basiorum
 An Amorem I
 An Amorem II
 Amor Omnibus
 O Amabilis Amor
 Nam Sum II
 Amor Aeternus II

References and external links
 Nicholas Lens' Website Official website 
 Time magazine 
 Schott Music International 
 
 Biff, New York 
 Compact Discoveries 
 Sonymusic 
 Sony BMG 
 Fan Page

Music dramas
Compositions by Nicholas Lens
Postmodern music
Contemporary classical compositions